The Ramón Rosa National Literature Award is an honor presented annually by the President of Honduras.

History
Named in honor of the liberal writer and government minister Ramón Rosa (1848–1993), the award was created by legislative decree in 1949, and first given in 1951, to Luis Andrés Zúniga. It was restructured by Legislative Decree no. 100 on 11 October 1967.

It is presented annually at the Presidential Palace to a writer whose work has national and international significance.

Categories
The Ramón Rosa National Literature Award is given for works in the areas of poetry, novel, short story, oratory and narration, journalism, drama, essay, criticism, and any other genre that contributes to the development of letters and culture in the country.

There is only one winner per year; awards are not given in the individual categories.

Winners

References

1951 establishments in Honduras
Awards established in 1951
Latin American literary awards